Ardenticatena is a Gram-negative, thermophilic and chemoheterotrophic genus of bacteria from the family of Ardenticatenaceae with one known species (Ardenticatena maritima). Ardenticatena maritima has been isolated from iron-rich sediments from a coastal hydrothermal field from Kagoshima in Japan.

References

Chloroflexota
Bacteria genera
Monotypic bacteria genera